Žitineni is a village in the municipality of Centar Župa, North Macedonia.

Demographics
Žitineni has traditionally been inhabited by Orthodox Macedonians and a Muslim Macedonian (Torbeš) population of which both groups speak the Macedonian language. A few Albanians live in the village alongside the Macedonian Muslim population in Žitineni.

As of the 2021 census, Žitineni had 258 residents with the following ethnic composition:
Turks 224
Persons for whom data are taken from administrative sources 33
Albanians 1

According to the 2002 census, the village had a total of 537 inhabitants. Ethnic groups in the village include:
Turks 536
Albanians 1

References

Villages in Centar Župa Municipality
Macedonian Muslim villages
Turkish communities in North Macedonia